Fikri (Arabic: فِكْرِي fik·riy, fik·rī, fik·ry) also spelled Fekri, is a masculine given Arabic name or surname in the possessive form, which generally means "thoughtful" but also could bear the meaning "intellectually, mentally, spiritual". It may refer to:

Given name

Fakri
 Ahmad Fakri Saarani (born 1989), Malaysian footballer

Fekri
 Fekri Al-Hubaishi, Yemeni footballer

Fekry
 Fekry Abaza (1896-1979), Egyptian journalist and political activist

Fikri
 Ahmet Fikri Tüzer (1878–1942), Turkish politician
 Bekir Fikri (1882-1914), Ottoman officer and revolutionary
 Fikri El Haj Ali (born 1985), German footballer
 Fikri Elma (1934-1999), Turkish footballer
 Fikri Işık (born 1965), Turkish educator, politician and government minister
 Fikri Karadağ, retired Turkish army general
 Fikri Sağlar (born 1953), Turkish politician and government minister

Surname

Fekri
 Hossein Fekri, Iranian footballer
 Mahmoud Fekri, Iranian footballer
 Sara Khoshjamal Fekri, Iranian taekwondoka

Fikri
 Mohd Nasir Ibrahim Fikri, Malaysian politician

Other uses
 Nurul Fikri Boarding School, secondary schools in Indonesia

Arabic masculine given names
Iranian-language surnames
Malaysian masculine given names
Turkish masculine given names